Schillonie Calvert (born 27 July 1988) is a Jamaican sprinter who specializes in the 100 metres. She made the 4x100 relay team for Jamaica as a reserve for the 2011 World Championships in Athletics in Daegu and the 2012 Summer Olympics in London.  She did not participate at the 2012 Worlds.  She ran in the 4 × 100 m heat with the Jamaican team at the 2012 London Olympics which later went on to take silver in the finals.  She competed as an individual in the 100 m at the 2013 World Championships, where she was also part of the Jamaican team that won gold in the 4 × 100 m.  She competed in the 100 m, 200 m and 4 × 100 m at the 2014 Commonwealth Games, and was part of the 4 × 100 m team that set a new Games record.

Personal bests

References

External links
IAAF Profile
Pace Sport Management Profile
London Olympic Profile

1988 births
Living people
Jamaican female sprinters
Athletes (track and field) at the 2012 Summer Olympics
Olympic athletes of Jamaica
Olympic silver medalists for Jamaica
Commonwealth Games medallists in athletics
Medalists at the 2012 Summer Olympics
Athletes (track and field) at the 2014 Commonwealth Games
Olympic silver medalists in athletics (track and field)
Commonwealth Games gold medallists for Jamaica
Pan American Games medalists in athletics (track and field)
Pan American Games silver medalists for Jamaica
Athletes (track and field) at the 2015 Pan American Games
World Athletics Championships athletes for Jamaica
World Athletics Championships winners
Athletes (track and field) at the 2019 Pan American Games
Medalists at the 2015 Pan American Games
Olympic female sprinters
20th-century Jamaican women
21st-century Jamaican women
Medallists at the 2014 Commonwealth Games